Conor Dooley (born 28 July 1993) is an Irish hurler who plays as a forward for Ballyboden St Enda's and formerly as a goalkeeper for the Dublin county hurling team.

References

1993 births
Living people
Ballyboden St Enda's hurlers
Dublin inter-county hurlers
Hurling goalkeepers